Farben meiner Welt (Colors of My World) is the second studio album by German recording artist Yvonne Catterfeld, released by Hansa Records and BMG on 1 March 2004.

Track listing

Charts

Weekly charts

Year-end charts

Release history

References

External links
 YvonneCatterfeld.com — official site

2004 albums
Yvonne Catterfeld albums